Aldo Aimi (19 July 1906 – 1 January 1980) was an Italian football player, who operated in a variety positions in defence, midfield and even in goal. He was born in Modena, Italy. A tireless player, short of stature, Aimi possessed remarkable agility and speed married to his stamina.

Career
Aimi started career his in 1925 with Parma, where he stayed for a year. He then moved on to hometown club Modena, where he stayed until his career's end in 1933. He made 67 appearances in Serie A in his career, all with Modena.

References

1906 births
Sportspeople from Modena
Italian footballers
Parma Calcio 1913 players
Modena F.C. players
Serie A players
Serie B players
1980 deaths
Association football utility players
Association football defenders
Association football midfielders
Footballers from Emilia-Romagna